Ismet Đuherić (born 14 March 1949) was the first commander of the Meša Selimović Company (named for Yugoslav writer Meša Selimović) of the Army of the Republika Srpska (the Bosnian Serb Army). The unit consisted of 120 men, mostly Muslim Serbs from a few villages in the municipalities of Bosanski Brod and Derventa, but also Serbs and Croats. According to some reporters, the unit was and until today remains one of the controversies of the Bosnian War. During the Bosnian war, Bosniaks were mostly expelled from the Serb-controlled territories in the process which would later be known as ethnic cleansing, excluding some villagers who were instead organized into Meša Selimović unit with the help of Slavko Lisica, a Serb general who accepted to help remaining Bosniaks on Ismet Đuherić's request. 

Today Ismet Đuherić lives with his wife Hanumica in the village of Sijekovac near Bosanski Brod. He and his daughter are employees of the oil refinery in Brod. Discounting several months spent as refugees in the nearby villages of Dubočac and Kobas, the Đuherićs are the only Muslim family that has run out of the village of Sijekovac during the war. After the war  Đuherić has been elected to serve as president of the Sijekovac local community again, as he did before the war.

He declares himself a Yugoslav.

References

External links
Četa poštenih agresora (BH Dani)
Company of honest aggressors
Zapisi iz sveske s modrim koricama: Musa i osmeh (BH Dani)

1949 births
Living people
Bosnia and Herzegovina Muslims
Army of Republika Srpska soldiers